Scott Clark  may refer to:
Scott Clark (BMX rider) (born 1962), American professional BMX racer
R. Scott Clark (born 1961), American Reformed pastor and seminary professor
Scott Clark (Santa Barbara), a fictional character on the American soap opera Santa Barbara
Scott Clark (comics), American comic book artist
Scott Clark (tennis) (born 1977), New Zealand tennis player